Shiva Rajkumar is an Indian actor who appears in Kannada films. He is the eldest son of actor Rajkumar. Shiva has acted in more than 100 films. In a career spanning over 35 years, he had a minimum of 3 releases every year for 19 consecutive years from 1992 to 2010 and has had at least two films in all the year except on four occasions (1987, 2011, 2012, 2015) until the pandemic disrupted the film releases.

Film

As dubbing artist

As singer

References

External links
 

Indian filmographies
Male actor filmographies
Discographies of Indian artists